The 2019–20 season is the 72nd season of competitive association football in Honduras.

National teams

Senior team

CONCACAF Nations League

Other matches

Olympic team

CONCACAF Olympic Qualifying Championship

Pan American Games

Domestic clubs

Promotion and relegation

Summer transfers

Winter transfers

Liga Nacional

Liga de Ascenso

Major League

Honduran Cup

Honduran Supercup

CONCACAF Champions League

CONCACAF League

Other matches
TBA

Deaths

References

 
Honduras
Honduras
Football
Football